Tepe Hissar (also spelled Tappeh Hesār) is a prehistoric site located in the village Heydarabad just south of Damghan in Semnan Province in northeastern Iran.

The site is notable for its uninterrupted occupational history from the 5th to the 2nd millennium BCE. The quantity and elaborateness of its excavated artifacts and funerary customs position the site prominently as a cultural bridge between Mesopotamia and Central Asia.

Archaeology
The overall site covers 200 hectares including multiple mounds and several middle Islamic fortresses. The main tell has an extent of 12 hectares.

The site was firstly discovered in 1877 by Albert Houtum-Schindler and then investigated in 1931 and 1932 by Erich Schmidt, on behalf of the University of Pennsylvania Museum (Schmidt 1933). A surface survey was carried out in 1972, while in 1976 a re-study project was performed, utilizing modern methods of stratigraphic assessments, ceramic typological analysis and radiocarbon dating, by the University of Pennsylvania Museum, the University of Turin and Iran Center for Archaeological Research. In 1995, a rescue excavation, due to a rail line being run through the center of the site, was conducted by Esmaiil Yaghmaii, followed by areal soundings in 2006.

Periodisation
The human occupation has been divided into three major periods (I, II and III).

Chalcolithic 
The earliest dating is uncertain but established as after 5000 BCE in the Chalcolithic period. This period (Hissar IA and IB) is characterized by mud-bricks buildings and hand-made (IA) and fine wheel-made (IB) ware, decorated with geometric, plant and animal patterns. The most widespread shapes are represented by small cups, bowls and vases.

Early Bronze 
In the second period (Hissar IIA and IIB), dated to the 4th millennium BC and the beginning of the 3rd, the burnished grey ware becomes predominant and the large number of lapis lazuli beads and alabaster finds, as well as the evidence of large-scale production of copper-based alloys and lead-silver, suggests that the site was playing a very important role in the trade and export of metal artifacts and semi-precious stones from the Middle Asia quarries to Mesopotamia and Egypt.

Early Bronze-Middle Bronze 
The third period of development (Hissar IIIA, IIIB and IIIC, chronologically attributed to the second half of the 3rd millennium BC and the beginning of the 2nd (Bronze Age), can be described as a proto-urban phase, mainly characterized by increased wealth, demographic concentration, mass production of plain ware and the construction of large public and ceremonial buildings. The finding of mass burials and individuals showing signs of violence have been interpreted as either due to warfare or interpersonal violence.

There is considerable cultural continuity from the early Cheshmeh Ali-period settlements in Iran, and into the later Hissar period.

"Traditionally, the early ceramic sequence of
north-eastern Iran begins with Neolithic Soft Wares (c.
6000 BC), then Djeitun wares (sixth millennium BC),
Cheshmeh Ali “clinky” wares (c. 5300–4300? BC),
and finally Hissar IA wares."

Burned Building
In the Hissar IIIB period, the Burned Building is worth mentioning. It has been variously interpreted due to the richness of its contents and the presence of burned human bodies and flint arrowheads. Firstly interpreted as a fortification, the discovery of a small fire altar suggests that it may be a shrine (Dyson and Remsen 1989).

Significant changes happened at the end of the 3rd millennium BC. The well-planned architecture of period Hissar IIIB was abandoned and replaced by the poorly organized structures of the Hissar IIIC period, laid out without regard to the plan of the earlier settlement. Moreover, we can mention the first appearance of truly elite burials, such as those of the so-called “Warriors”, the “Priest” and the “Little Girl” (Schmidt 1933), some of them contained BMAC items such as grooved stone columns.

Agriculture

The subsistence economy was based on agriculture. From Hissar II onward plant remains indicate “an agricultural system based on cereals [glume and free-threshing wheats, naked and hulled barley] and the utilization of local fruit [olive, grapevine] plant resources” (Costantini and Dyson, p. 66). Lentil seeds, peas and legumes were also present. Animal (cattle, goat and sheep) figurines indicate herding activities.

In 1931-32 E.F. Schmidt recorded about eight hundred burials, of which only some have been fully described and published: 33 for the period Hissar I, 24 for Hissar II and 38 for Hissar III. Most of the graves are represented by individual burial in simple pits, with the skeleton laying on its side, in a flexed position and the skull oriented towards east and north-east. Some collective graves are attested and four rich graves of the Hissar IIIC period were found in 1931.

Metal production
The presence of full-time specialists seems to be attested already in the first Chalcolithic period. Regarding the metal production, already in Hissar I period, both weapons (daggers, knife blades, arrowheads) and other tools (pins, tacks, points and needles) were made.

In Hissar II and III copper artifacts increase in quality and variety and include personal ornaments (earrings, pendants, bracelets, bands), tools and weapons (bidents, lances, mattocks, chisels, mace heads), and luxury items (vessels, mirrors, boxes and intricately cast pins and rods).

The important site of Tureng Tepe is located in the same area of Iran, and has some parallels to Hissar.

A related site of Shir Ashian Tepe is located about 20 km southwest of Hissar; it helped to clarify the chronology of Hissar.

Gallery

See also
Cities of the ancient Near East
Tepe Sialk

References

Bibliography 
 L. Costantini and R.H. Dyson Jr., “The Ancient Agriculture of the Damghan Plain: The Archaeological Evidence from Tepe Hissar,” in N.F. Miller, ed.,Economy and Settlement in the Near East: Analyses of Ancient Sites and Materials, MASCA, Research Papers in Science and Archaeology 7, Suppl., Philadelphia, 1990, pp. 46–68. 
 R.H. Dyson Jr. and W. C. S. Remsen, “Observations on Architecture and Stratigraphy at Tappeh Hesar,” in R.H. Dyson Jr. and S. Howard, eds., pp. 69–109.
Gürsan-Salzmann, Ayşe, The New Chronology of the Bronze Age Settlement of Tepe Hissar, Iran, University of Pennsylvania Press for the University of Pennsylvania Museum of Archaeology and Anthropology, 2016 
 E.F. Schmidt, “The Tepe Hissar Excavations 1931,” Museum Journal of Philadelphia 23/4, 1933, pp 322–485.

External links
 E Schmidt 1931 excavtion video at Archive.org
Robert H. Dyson, "TEPE HISSAR (Tappa Ḥeṣār)", Encyclopaedia Iranica

Tells (archaeology)
Former populated places in Iran
Archaeological sites in Iran
Buildings and structures in Semnan Province
Neolithic sites of Asia